Gemini is the name of different fictional characters appearing in American comic books published by Marvel Comics.

Publication history
The original Gemini first appeared in The Avengers #72 (Jan. 1970), and was created by Roy Thomas and Sal Buscema.

The character subsequently appears in The Avengers #80-82 (Sept.–Nov. 1970), Daredevil #69 (Oct. 1970), Iron Man #33-36 (Jan.–April 1971), Daredevil #73 (Feb. 1971), Astonishing Tales #8 (Oct. 1971), #15-20 (Dec. 1972-Oct. 1973), The Avengers #120-125 (Feb.–July 1974), #130-134 (Dec. 1974-April 1975), Giant-Size Avengers #3-4 (Feb., June 1975), Iron Man #184-185 (July–Aug. 1984), and The West Coast Avengers vol. 2 #26 (Nov. 1987), in which he is killed.

Gemini appeared as part of the "Zodiac" entry in the Official Handbook of the Marvel Universe Deluxe Edition #20.

Fictional character biography

Joshua Link
Joshua Link fell in with a bad crowd in school, becoming more wild and progressing to criminal activities; he started with penny-ante crimes, such as stealing from the grocery, and continuing on to rolling others for money and other valuables. He started to collect expensive friends with expensive tastes "booze, broads, gambling" and the more he tried these things the more he wanted. Eventually his father threw him out and told him to never come back.

Working with the criminals Monk and Brackett, Joshua was transporting some stolen materials out of Futura Research Laboratory when they were confronted by Officers Jeff Hanley and Damian Link. Distracted by encountering his brother on the job, Damian and his partner were easily ambushed by Joshua's allies. In the ensuing struggle, Joshua and Damian were knocked into a metal chamber where they grasped hands as they were bombarded by "nameless experimental rays", until Brackett managed to deactivate the device. The criminals dragged Joshua, whose hair had turned stark white away with them, leaving Damian for dead and shooting and killing Officer Hanley. However, 48 hours later, when they heard that Damian had survived and that he had identified Joshua, Brackett and the others decided that they would have to kill Joshua to prevent being linked to the crimes via their association with him. Joshua tried to flee, but was shot in the shoulder; in desperation he called out for his brother to help him, and Damian felt the contact, following it to save his brother. With his abilities suddenly doubled by his connection to his brother, Damian chased down and took out the other criminals. He then turned Joshua over to other policemen.

Joshua joined Zodiac, and his base of operations was Boston, Massachusetts. The Zodiac was founded by Cornelius van Lunt (Taurus), who hand picked the eleven other members; van Lunt concealed his own identity, while he was the only one who knew the identities of the others. Each member was based in a different American city (Gemini in Boston, Massachusetts) as part of his nationwide criminal network, with the ultimate goal of world economic and political domination

The Zodiac was infiltrated by Nick Fury, posing as Scorpio; the Zodiac fought the Avengers and escaped. Led by Taurus, the Zodiac later attempted to kill all Manhattan residents born under the sign of Gemini as a show of power, but were thwarted by the Avengers. Taurus's faction attempted to kill the Zodiac dissident faction, but all twelve leaders were captured by the Avengers. A new android version of the Zodiac later appeared, led by Scorpio in a new android body, massacred the human Zodiac, and took over their criminal operations.

Android Zodiac
Scorpio (Jake Fury) constructed the android Zodiac members, although his plan was thwarted by the Defenders. Quicksilver employed the android Zodiac to attack the West Coast Avengers, but the Avengers defeated the Zodiac. Led by Scorpio in a new android body, the android Zodiac massacred the human Zodiac, and took over their criminal operations. They battled the West Coast Avengers, but were rendered inert when they were transported to the dimension of the Brotherhood of the Ankh.

Ecliptic Gemini
The Gemini that worked for Ecliptic was actually two people. One of the Geminis was actually Madison Jeffries who was brainwashed into serving the Zodiac. The two Geminis spoke as one when they are together.

Thanos' Gemini
The fourth Gemini is an unnamed man who Thanos recruited to join his incarnation of the Zodiac. He and the other Zodiac members perish when Thanos abandons them on the self-destructing Helicarrier where Cancer was the only survivor.

Powers and abilities
Due to an electrical accident, Link became psionically linked with his twin brother Damian, a policeman. Hence, Joshua Link can take mental control of Damian Link's mind and body, and can add Damian's physical strength to that of his own body.

The android Gemini possessed multiple personalities representing the Zodiac sign that it was based on. Gemini can also release two clones of itself with one being white (the reason personality which can fire energy blasts) and one being black (the emotion personality which can release jolts of electricity by touch). Gemini later gained the ability to expand its form where it grows in size and gains super-strength. In its second form, Gemini can fly and release blasts of energy. Gemini in this form also exhibited a talkative personality.

The Ecliptic Gemini that served as Madison Jeffries' "twin" did not demonstrate any powers.

In other media
 Gemini appears in The Avengers: United They Stand,  voiced by Nigel Hamer (male head) and Julie Lemieux (female head). This version is a two-headed, four-armed alien and a member of Zodiac.
 Gemini appears in Marvel Anime: Iron Man, voiced by Takako Honda in Japanese and Laura Bailey in English. This version is Dr. Chika Tanaka, a sleeper agent for Zodiac who was brainwashed into serving them and wears a powered suit of armor as Gemini.
 The Gemini alias appears in the seventh season of Agents of S.H.I.E.L.D., used by Ernest "Hazard" Koenig (portrayed by Patton Oswalt), who runs a speakeasy in 1931 New York City that would later become an asset to S.H.I.E.L.D.'s predecessor, the Strategic Scientific Reserve.

References

External links
 
 

Characters created by Roy Thomas
Characters created by Sal Buscema
Comics characters introduced in 1970
Fictional characters from Boston
Marvel Comics characters with superhuman strength
Marvel Comics mutates
Marvel Comics supervillains